The Dictator is a 1915 American silent comedy film directed by Oscar Eagle and reputedly Edwin S. Porter. It was based on a play The Dictator by Richard Harding Davis and produced by Adolph Zukor (Famous Players Film Company) and the Charles Frohman Company. John Barrymore stars in a role played on the stage by William Collier, Sr. whose company Barrymore had performed in this play. The film was rereleased on April 13, 1919 as part of the Paramount "Success Series" of their early screen successes. The story was refilmed in 1922 as The Dictator starring Wallace Reid. Today both films are lost.

The film was shot partially in Cuba.

Cast
John Barrymore as Brooke Travers
Charlotte Ives as Lucy Sheridan
Ruby Hoffman as Juanita
Ivan F. Simpson as Simpson
Walter Craven as General Campos
Robert Broderick as Colonel Bowie
Esther Lyon as Mrs. Bowie
Henry West as Reverend Bostick (as Harry West)
Mario Majeroni as General Rivas
Thomas McGrath as Duffy

See also
John Barrymore on stage, screen and radio

References

External links

The AFI Catalog of Feature Films:The Dictator

1915 films
American silent feature films
American films based on plays
Lost American films
1915 comedy films
Silent American comedy films
American black-and-white films
Films set in South America
1915 lost films
Lost comedy films
1910s American films